The Lancer 30 Mark V, also called the Lancer 30 -5, is an American sailboat that was designed by C&C Design as a cruiser and first built in 1980.

The Lancer 30 Mark V is a development of the Lancer 30 Mark IV, which traces its origins to the C&C 30 molds.

Production
The design was built by Lancer Yachts in the United States, between 1980 and 1985, but it is now out of production.

Design
The Lancer 30 Mark V is a recreational keelboat, built predominantly of fiberglass, with wood trim. It has a fractional sloop rig, a raked stem; a raised counter, reverse transom; an internally mounted spade-type rudder controlled by a tiller and a fixed fin keel. It displaces  and carries  of ballast.

The boat is fitted with an inboard engine for docking and maneuvering.

The design has sleeping accommodation for four people, with a double "V"-berth in the bow cabin with a drop leaf table and an aft cabin with a double berth on the port side. The galley is located on the starboard side amidships. The galley is an open "L"-shape and is equipped with a two-burner stove and a double sink. The head is located on the starboard side at the companionway steps.

See also
List of sailing boat types

References

External links
Photo of Lancer 30 Mark V

Keelboats
1980s sailboat type designs
Sailing yachts
Sailboat type designs by C&C Design
Sailboat types built by Lancer Yachts